Matthew Hall (born 5 July 1984) is a British professional boxer. He is a former Commonwealth light middleweight champion, having also challenged for the British and European light middleweight titles as well as the British and Commonwealth middleweight titles.

Early professional career
Hall's professional debut came in September 2002 with a win over boxing journeyman Pedro Thompson, stopping him in the first round at the MEN Arena in Manchester.  His very next fight against the same opponent saw Hall travel to Newcastle in order to beat Thompson again but this time on points over 4 rounds meaning that at the end of his debut year Hall has compiled an unbeaten record of 2-0. Over the course of the next four years, Hall fought fourteen more times against a host of other journeymen winning every fight meaning that his record at the end of 2006 stood at sixteen wins with no defeats.  Hall's progress at this time was all the more impressive as in 2003 he had been the victim of a stabbing incident which nearly cost him his life.  Speaking to the Daily Mirror about the incident Hall said "I had my bowel perforated six times and lost five or six litres of blood...I was in a bad way and it took me about a year to recover. It's not good getting stabbed."  Speaking in 2009 Hall preferred to seek positives from the incident saying "It did my career a favour because it held me back a year or two. I could have had meaningful fights when I was younger and not been ready. I could have been and gone."

Defeat and fightback
Hall's perfect record however was about to be shattered in his first fight of 2007.  The fight in July was to come a full year after the last time Hall had stepped into the ring when he had beaten Kevin Phelan with a 1st round stoppage.  A year later the boot was to be on the other foot when, at the O2 Arena in London, Martin Concepcion stopped Hall in the first round handing him his first defeat in 5 years as a professional boxer.  Hall responded to the defeat with a number of wins over worthy opponents.  On 3 December 2007 he defeated Tyan Booth at the Piccadilly Hotel in Manchester and on 22 March 2008 in his first fight of the new year beat the unbeaten Kerry Hope at the International Arena in Cardiff.  On 6 September 2008 he beat the former Celtic title challenger Taz Jones and on 10 October 2008 returned to Manchester to beat former Irish champion Ciaran Healy at the MEN Arena. On 12 December 2008 in his last fight of the year, Hall capped off a series of four wins in a row following the Concepcion defeat to stop former Central Area champion Jason Rushton in Widnes.

Commonwealth Champion
Hall's winning run was to pay dividends as on 14 March 2009 Hall defeated defending champion Bradley Pryce to lift the Commonwealth championship knocking Pryce out in the 2nd round.  Disappointment following however when on 18 July 2009 Hall lost his title in his first defence at the MEN Arena in Manchester.  He was defeated by Anthony Small in a fight which also saw the vacant British title on the line, the referee stopping the fight in the 8th round handing both belts to Small.  Following the contest Hall split from his longtime trainer Brian Hughes and moved to try and rebuild with Bolton-based trainer Karl Ince.  Speaking of the change in direction Hall said that he had been "embarrassed" by his performance and added that "sometimes you need a change".  In his first contest following the defeat on 15 May 2010, Hall scored a 5th round stoppage win over Tony Randell the British Masters champion in a non-title bout.

European title attempt
On 18 September 2010 as part of Frank Warrens 'Magnificent Seven' card, Hall lost for the third time in his career.  The fight, for the vacant European title, had come at short notice for Hall following an injury to Ryan Rhodes who had been due to defend the belt on the card.  The injury had meant that the belt became vacant and Hall stepped in to fight the Czech Republics Lucas Konecny. In the end Konecny proved too much of a step up for Hall and following two knockdowns in the 6th round the referee stopped the fight.  A disappointed Hall announced after the fight that it would be his last that he would retire.

Return from retirement and British title elimination fight
In October 2011, Hall returned to the professional fight game. He suffered a shock defeat to Bulgarian Alex Ribchev on points shown live on new boxing channel BoxNation. Hall then fought and defeated Kris Carslaw in a British light middleweight title elimination fight.

Hall suffered another defeat at the hands of Irish fighter Gary O'Sullivan, at Upton Park, London, on 14 July.

Professional boxing record

References

1984 births
Living people
English male boxers
Boxers from Manchester
Light-middleweight boxers